Madaraka Day ("Internal self rule" or Self-Governance Day) is a national holiday that is celebrated every 1 June in every year in the Republic of Kenya. It commemorates the day in 1963 that Kenya attained internal self rule after being a British colony since 1920. Kenya only attain partial independence on this day in 1963 and did not become a fully established republic until about a year and a half later on 12 December 1964. In recognition of the above, Kenya also celebrates Jamhuri Day (Republic Day) on  12 December every year.

Madaraka is a Swahili word for "authority, ruling power".

See also 
 Jamhuri Day
 Mashujaa Day
 Public holidays in Kenya

External links 
Global Policy – Madaraka Day in Kenya
National Holidays in 2011
Madaraka Day Images

References 

History of Kenya
June observances
1963 in Kenya
Public holidays in Kenya